Abdul Salam Hanafi (Uzbek/) is an Afghan Uzbek political and Deobandi-Islamic religious leader who is a senior leader of the Taliban, an acting second deputy prime minister, alongside Abdul Ghani Baradar and Abdul Kabir, of Afghanistan since 2021, and was a central member of the negotiation team in the Qatar office. He has also served as deputy minister of education in the Taliban government from 1996-2001. After the Taliban government collapse in 2001, following the United States invasion of Afghanistan, Hanafi was appointed by the Taliban leadership as a top general to oversee the Taliban’s military activities in Jowzjan Province, Northern Afghanistan from May 2007 until sometime in 2008.

Abdul Salam Hanafi is from Jowzjan Province, which is located in northern Afghanistan. He has studied at various religious seminaries including Jamia Darul Uloom, Karachi, Pakistan. Hanafi is given the esteemed title of Mawlawi, which is a title given to those who studied at Deobandi religious schools or Madrasas. He has also been teaching at Kabul University for some time. Abdul Salam Hanafi has been part of the Taliban movement from the beginning. However, he is generally known among the Taliban as an Alim-e Din (scholar of the faith).

Early life and education
An ethnic Uzbek, Hanafi was born in 1969 in the Gardan village in the Darzab District of Jowzjan Province.

He got his initial education under local Islamic scholars, studying subjects such as Arabic grammar, logic, rhetoric, jurisprudence and Qur’anic recitation.

He later moved to Pakistan for further religious studies, studying the traditional Islamic sciences, mathematics, logic and other subjects at Jamia Darul Uloom, Karachi, as well madrasas in cities such as Peshawar, Bahawalpur and Rahim Yar Khan.

Outside religion he also studied computer science, accounting and languages, mastering, outside his native Uzbek, Pashto, Persian, English, Arabic, Urdu, Kyrgyz, Turkmen and Turkish.

After completing his studies he became a teacher in different institutions, for instance teaching Islamic culture for three years at Kabul University’s Faculty of Law and Political Science.

See also
 Zia ur Rahman Madani

References

1969 births
Living people
People from Jowzjan Province
Taliban leaders
Taliban government ministers of Afghanistan
Afghan Uzbek politicians
Afghan expatriates in Pakistan
Deobandis
Jamia Darul Uloom, Karachi alumni
Academic staff of Kabul University